Kossmaticeras is an extinct ammonoid genus belonging to the desmoceratacean family Kossmaticeratidae. Species in this genus were fast-moving nektonic carnivores. They lived during the Late Cretaceous, from upper Turonian to upper Maastrichtian age. The type species of the genus is Ammonites theobaldianus.

Subgenera and species 

 Kossmaticeras (Karapadites) Collignon, 1954
 Kossmaticeras (Karapadites) besairieri Collignon, 1954
 Kossmaticeras (Karapadites) karapadensis Kossmat, 1897
 Kossmaticeras (Karapadites) madrasinus Stoliczka, 1865
 Kossmaticeras (Karapadites) planissimus  Collignon, 1966
 Kossmaticeras (Kossmaticeras) de Grossouvre, 1901
 Kossmaticeras (Kossmaticeras) inornatum Collignon, 1966
 Kossmaticeras (Kossmaticeras) jeletzkyi Collignon, 1965
 Kossmaticeras (Kossmaticeras) jonesi Collignon, 1965
 Kossmaticeras (Kossmaticeras) kilenensis Alsen, 2018
 Kossmaticeras (Kossmaticeras) sakondryense Collignon, 1954
 Kossmaticeras (Kossmaticeras) sparsicostatum Kossmat, 1897
 Kossmaticeras (Kossmaticeras) theobaldianum Stolickza, 1865
 Kossmaticeras (Natalites) Collignon, 1954
 Kossmaticeras (Natalites) africanus van Hoepen, 1920
 Kossmaticeras (Natalites) elegans Kennedy, 1985
 Kossmaticeras (Natalites) similis Spath, 1921
 Kossmaticeras (Natalites) canadense McLearn, 1972

Distribution 
Fossils of species within this genus have been found in the Cretaceous sediments of Antarctica, Australia, Canada, Chile, India, Madagascar, New Zealand and South Africa.

References

Further reading 
 Arkell et al. 1957. Mesozoic Ammonoidea, L374; Treatise on Invertebrate Paleontology Part L (Ammonoidea); Geol Soc of America and Univ Kansas Press.

Desmoceratoidea
Ammonitida genera
Cretaceous ammonites
Ammonites of Australia
Ammonites of South America
Cretaceous Africa
Cretaceous Asia
Cretaceous animals of Australia
Cretaceous Canada
Cretaceous Chile